Beaumont-Pied-de-Bœuf may refer to the following places in France:

 Beaumont-Pied-de-Bœuf, Mayenne, a commune in the Mayenne department
 Beaumont-Pied-de-Bœuf, Sarthe, a commune in the Sarthe department